Pasteuria is a genus of mycelial and endospore-forming, nonmotile gram-positive bacteria that are obligate parasites of some nematodes and crustaceans.  The genus of Pasteuria was previously classified within the family Alicyclobacillaceae, but has since been moved to the family Pasteuriaceae.

Steps of infection 
Animals that are susceptible to Pasteuria become infected when they are exposed to spores in soil or water. Therefore, Pasteuria are transmitted horizontally between hosts and when an infected host dies, it releases spores to the soil or sediment. The likelihood of infections is related to the spore density in the environment and can be affected by temperature. After contact with the host, Pasteuria spores are activated, attach to their host, penetrate the host's cuticle, proliferate within the host, and kill the host. In water fleas, the ability of the spore to successfully attach during the infection process is related to the genotype of the host and the parasite. Spore cells that do not infect animals and pass through a resistant host can still remain viable and infectious.

Effects of parasite 
Following infection with Pasteuria, the parasite interferes with the reproduction of their female hosts. Hosts can live with the parasite for a prolonged period of time after infection. In Daphnia, P. ramosa induces gigantism. P. penetrans parasitized females of the nematode Meloidogyne javanica, on the other hand, were smaller than healthy individuals.

Potential as biocontrol 
Due to the effect of Pasteuria on reproduction, especially on nematode pests of important crops, there is an interest to develop Pasteuria as a biological control agent. In 2012, Syngenta acquired a company named Pateuria Bioscience to commercialize Pasteuria as a biological control. In 2013, Syngenta launched CLARIVA™ pn, which has the active ingredient of Pasteuria nishizawae to combat the soybean cyst nematode. The effectiveness of Pasteuria as a biocontrol may depend on the biotypes of the nematode host that are present since they can vary in their susceptibility to Pasteuria.

Species of Pasteuria and their hosts 
Currently, four species of Pasteuria and two candidate species are described, all of which are obligate parasites with specific hosts. The described species and their hosts include:
 P. nishizawae Sayre et al. 1992: parasite of cyst-forming nematodes in the genera Heterodera and Globodera.
 P. penetrans Thorne 1940 ex Sayre & Starr 1986: parasite of root knot nematodes in the genus Meloidogyne spp.
 P. ramosa Metchnikoff 1888: parasite of Cladocerans, including Daphnia.
 P. thornei Starr & Sayre 1988: parasite of root-lesion nematodes in the genus Pratylenchus.

Candidate species and their hosts include:
 P. aldrichii Giblin-Davis et al. 2011: parasite of bacterivorous nematodes in the genus Bursilla spp.
 P. usage Giblin-Davis et al. 2003: parasite of the sting nematode, Belonolaimus longicaudatus

Additional species of Pasteuria have been named but are yet to be formally described, including:
 "P. hartismeri" Atibalentja et al. 2002b
 "P. goettingianae" Bishop et al. 2007.

References

Gram-positive bacteria
Bacteria genera